First Church in Boston is a Unitarian Universalist Church (originally Congregationalist) founded in 1630 by John Winthrop's original Puritan settlement in Boston, Massachusetts. The current building, located on 66 Marlborough Street in the Back Bay neighborhood, was designed by Paul Rudolph in a modernist style after a fire in 1968. It incorporates part of the earlier gothic revival building designed by William Robert Ware and Henry Van Brunt in 1867. The church has long been associated with Harvard University.

History
The church congregation was established in 1630, when the settlers on the Arbella arrived at the site of present-day Charlestown, Massachusetts.  John Wilson was the first minister, and the only minister while the church was in Charlestown.  Two years later they constructed a meeting house across the Charles River near what is now State Street in Boston, and Wilson was officially installed as minister there.  In 1633 John Cotton arrived from England, and was a teaching elder at the church, helping to establish the foundation of the Congregational Church, the official state church of Massachusetts. In 1677 Dorcas ye blackmore, a freed slave, became the first African American allowed to become a member of the church. In the 18th century, Charles Chauncy was a minister at First Church for sixty years, where he gained a reputation for opposing what he believed was the emotionalism of Jonathan Edwards during the Great Awakening.

A schism developed at the turn of the 19th century: this Trinitarian Christian church eventually transformed into a Unitarian congregation by the mid-19th century, as did many of the other state churches in Massachusetts. Massachusetts' state churches (largely Unitarian and Congregationalist, including First Church), were officially disaffiliated from the government in 1833.

In the 19th century, the First Church moved to Back Bay in Boston. The building at 66 Marlborough Street in Boston dated from 1868, and was designed by Boston architects William Robert Ware and Henry Van Brunt.

Second Church, also known as the "Church of the Mathers", was founded in 1649 when the population spread to the North End and justified an additional congregation sited closer to those individuals' homes. From 1664 to 1741, its clergy consisted of Increase Mather, Cotton Mather, and Samuel Mather. Both churches were examples of the westward movement of Boston churches from the crowded, older downtown area to the newer, more fashionable Back Bay. This area was developed for residential use after lowlands were filled in during the late 19th and early 20th centuries. Second Church's Back Bay location in the Fenway was sold (it is now owned by the Ruggles St. Baptist congregation) just before the merger.

After a disastrous fire in 1968, First Church and Second Church merged and built a new building at the 66 Marlborough Street location.

Architecture
The current building incorporates the ruined street facade and "puddingstone" steeple tower of the previous church on the site (by Ware & van Brunt, 1868), which had burned in 1968. After a call for designs, the congregation voted for the proposal by Paul Rudolph, which was completed in 1972.

The light-flooded, soaring interior is finished with Rudolph's characteristic bush hammered "corduroy concrete" surfaces. Decades later, the interiors are immaculately preserved. Great care has been taken not to permanently change the walls, and to reproduce the original textile decorations. However, the congregation has made an inspired non-permanent repurposing of the corrugated concrete interior finish, by pressing copper foil ribbons with names of members into the vertical grooves, in a non-hierarchical fashion.

Notable people associated with the church
Lowell Mason (organist 1807-1811)
John Wilson (pastor 1632–1667; died 1667)
 John Cotton (pastor 1633–1652)
 John Winthrop, founder and governor of Massachusetts Bay Colony
 John Norton (pastor 1656–1663)
 John Davenport (pastor 1668–1670)
 James Allen (pastor 1668–1710; died 1710)
 John Oxenbridge (pastor 1670–1674)
 Joshua Moodey (pastor 1684–1692; died 1697)
 John Bailey (pastor 1693–1697; died 1697)
 Benjamin Wadsworth (pastor 1696–1737)
 Thomas Bridge (pastor 1705–1715; died 1715)
 Thomas Foxcroft (pastor 1717–1769)
 Charles Chauncy (pastor 1727–1787)
 John Clarke (pastor 1778–1798)
 William Emerson (pastor 1799–1811)
 John Lovejoy Abbot (pastor 1813–1814)
 Nathaniel Langdon Frothingham (minister 1815–1850)
 Sophia Henrietta Emma Hewitt (music director 1815–17(?), daughter of James Hewitt
 Charles Zeuner (music director 1839–?)
 Lucien H Southard (music director 1848–?)
 Rufus Ellis (pastor 1853–c. 1885; died 1885)
 Whitney Eugene Thayer (music director 1869–1875)
 Arthur Foote (music director 1878–1910)
 Charles Edwards Park (minister 1906–1946, emeritus 1946–1962)
 Rhys Williams (minister 1960–2000)
 Stephen Kendrick (minister 2001–present)
 Paul Cienniwa (music director 2006–2017)

Gallery

State St. (1632–1639)

Washington St. (1639–1808)

Chauncy Place (1808–1867)

Marlborough St. (1868–present)

See also
 Second Church, Boston
Oldest churches in the United States

References

Further reading
 Leo W. Collins. This Is Our Church: The Seven Societies of the First Church in Boston 1630–2005. Boston: Society of the First Church in Boston, 2005. Google books
 Paul Rudolph & his architecture. A page from a website devoted to Rudolph's work, featuring photos of the church building. Paul Rudolph & his architecture

External links

 First Church in Boston website
 1630 Christian Covenant of First Church in Boston

1630 establishments in Massachusetts
Back Bay, Boston
Churches in Boston
Religious organizations established in the 1630s
Towers in Massachusetts
Unitarian Universalist churches in Massachusetts